Mister Alexander (born June 2, 1988) is an American football linebacker who is currently a free agent. He played college football at Florida State and was signed by the Houston Texans as an undrafted free agent in 2011.

Alexander has also played for the Toronto Argonauts of the Canadian Football League and Jacksonville Jaguars.

Professional career

Houston Texans
After going unselected in the 2011 NFL Draft, Alexander signed with the Houston Texans as an undrafted free agent.

Toronto Argonauts
Alexander was signed by the Toronto Argonauts of the Canadian Football League on June 6, 2013. He was released by the Argonauts on July 25, 2013.

Dallas Cowboys
On December 26, 2014, the Dallas Cowboys signed Alexander to their practice squad.

Seattle Seahawks
Alexander signed with the Seattle Seahawks on March 2, 2015. He was waived on June 12.

Jacksonville Jaguars
On August 24, 2015, Alexander was signed by the Jacksonville Jaguars. He was waived on August 29.

Los Angeles KISS
On April 7, 2016, Alexander was assigned on Los Angeles KISS.

Iowa Barnstormers
Alexander signed with the Iowa Barnstormers on May 3, 2016.

References

External links
 Houston Texans bio 
 Florida Seminoles bio

1988 births
Living people
People from Harris County, Texas
American football linebackers
Florida State Seminoles football players
Houston Texans players
Tampa Bay Buccaneers players
Dallas Cowboys players
Seattle Seahawks players
Jacksonville Jaguars players
Toronto Argonauts players
Sportspeople from Harris County, Texas
Players of American football from Texas
Omaha Mammoths players
Los Angeles Kiss players
Iowa Barnstormers players